The 2013 Pan American Women's Handball Championship was the twelfth edition of the Pan American Women's Handball Championship, which took place in the Dominican Republic from 1 to 8 June 2013. It acted as the American qualifying tournament for the 2013 World Women's Handball Championship to be held in Serbia from December 7 to 22. It was organized by the Pan-American Team Handball Federation. This was the second time that this tournament was held in the Dominican Republic after the 2007 Pan American Women's Handball Championship.

Teams

Preliminary round
All times local (UTC−4).

Group A

Group B

Knockout stage

Ninth place game

5–8th place bracket

5–8th place Semifinals

Seventh place game

Fifth place game

Final round

Semifinals

Third place game

Final

Final standing

Awards
 Best player  Alexandra do Nascimento

All-star team
 Goalkeeper  Mayssa Pessoa
 Left Wing  Nancy Peña
 Left Back  Irina Pop
 Playmaker  Ana Paula Rodrigues
 Right Back  Luciana Mendoza
 Right Wing  Alexandra do Nascimento
 Pivot  Magdalena Decilio

References

External links
Results & Standings
Pan american handball site
Results at todor66

Pan American Women's Handball Championship
Pan American Women's Handball Championship
Pan American Women's Handball Championship
Pan American Women's Handball Championships
Sport in Santo Domingo
June 2013 sports events in North America